Russell Payne may refer to:

Russell Payne (soccer) (born 1975), retired American soccer goalkeeper
Russell Payne (author) (born 1971), English author
Russell Payne (athlete) (1902–1970), American Olympic athlete